Gennady Mikhaylov (born 8 February 1974 in Cheboksary, Chuvash ASSR), is a former professional road bicycle racer from Russia. He last rode for UCI ProTour . He was part of the successful team , in which he assisted Robbie McEwen to numerous sprint victories. He won his first professional race in 2002.

Major results

1996 - Lada-CSKA
 Vuelta a Navarra - Stage 2
2002 - Lotto-Domo
 Tour de Luxembourg - Stage 5
2004 - U.S. Postal Service
 8th overall – Tour de l'Ain

External links

Russian male cyclists
1974 births
Living people
People from Cheboksary
Sportspeople from Chuvashia